The MLW RSC-24 was a type of diesel-electric locomotive built by Montreal Locomotive Works for use on Canadian National Railway (CN).

Only four RSC-24's were built – all in 1959 — and were numbered 1800–1803 by CN.  The locomotives were conceived by MLW as a way to use the 12-cylinder 244 diesel engines removed from 4 MLW FPA-2s which were receiving the more-capable Alco 251 engine (making them similar to the MLW FPA-4 locomotive).

In order to make the locomotive suitable for weight-restricted light rail branch lines, MLW built the locomotives using a switcher frame as a start, resulting in the "squashed" appearance of a road switcher. This was largely the result of a very short rear hood housing the electrical cabinet, whereas electrical cabinets were normally located in the long hood on most road switcher designs. In order to make the locomotive suitable for weight-restricted light rail branch lines, MLW spread the weight over the rail surface using A1A-A1A trucks (3 axle trucks, with the center axle of each truck unpowered) which were manufactured by Dominion Foundries and Steel (DOFASCO); this same truck was also adopted for the MLW RSC-13. This resulted in less traction, hence the need to de-rate the engine horsepower to avoid wheel slippage.

The RSC-24 was a one-of-a-kind diesel locomotive design, and CN used these unique units to replace 2-6-0 or 4-6-0 steam locomotives on light rail branch lines in eastern Canada.  In May 1969, 1802 was wrecked in a head-on collision at Pointe-à-la-Garde, Quebec.  The remaining three units found their way to the South Shore of Nova Scotia toward the end of their career by the late 1960s, and their domain extended throughout CN's former Halifax and Southwestern Railway system.

The troublesome model 244 diesel engine plagued the units throughout their lifespan, and they were retired in the mid-1970s, when CN also scrapped its MLW RSC-13 fleet; the A1A trucks of the RSC-13 and RSC-24 fleets were used by CN to retruck several dozen MLW RS-18s to become MLW RSC-14s.

See also 
 List of MLW diesel locomotives

A1A-A1A locomotives
RS-24C
Canadian National Railway locomotives
Railway locomotives introduced in 1959
Diesel-electric locomotives of Canada
Standard gauge locomotives of Canada